Laura Morante (born 21 August 1956) is an Italian film actress.

Life and career
Morante was born in Santa Fiora, province of Grosseto (Tuscany), the daughter of lawyer and playwright Marcello Morante, who was the son of Irma (née Poggibonsi) (a schoolteacher of Jewish descent) and Francesco Lo Monaco, from Sicily, and brother of the novelist Elsa Morante. Laura's mother is  Maria Bona Palazzeschi.

Originally a dancer, Morante started her acting career on stage at 18 years old, in the theatrical company of Carmelo Bene. She made her film debut in Oggetti Smarriti (Lost Belongings)., directed by Giuseppe Bertolucci, whose brother would direct the second film in which Morante would appear,  La Tragedia di un uomo ridicolo (The Tragedy of a Ridiculous Man). She eventually had her breakout thanks to Nanni Moretti, who gave her the title role in Bianca.

After her marriage to French actor Georges Claisse, Morante moved to Paris, where, thanks to her participation in numerous productions, she acquired a certain notoriety in European art cinema. Returned to Italy, in 2001 she eventually won the David di Donatello for best actress her performance in Moretti's The Son's Room. Later she was nominated for the David di Donatello in the same category in 2003, for Gabriele Muccino's Remember Me, My Love, and won the Silver Ribbon for best actress for Love Is Eternal While It Lasts (2003) by Carlo Verdone.

Morante attracted considerable attention with her performance as the neglected Madame Jourdain, with whom the young Molière, played by Romain Duris, falls in love, in the 2007 release Molière. She also provided the voice of Helen Parr/Elastigirl in the Italian-dubbed version of the Pixar animated film, The Incredibles. Very active in France, in 2012 Morante made her directorial debut with the French-Italian co-production Cherry on the Cake, for which she was nominated for the David di Donatello for Best New Director.

Filmography

Films

Television

References

External links

 

1956 births
20th-century Italian actresses
21st-century Italian actresses
David di Donatello winners
Italian film actresses
Living people
Nastro d'Argento winners
Ciak d'oro winners
People from Santa Fiora